Beverly Lynn Bennett is an American vegan chef and author. She hosts the Vegan Chef website; was a regular columnist for VegNews Magazine; and is a former instructor for the Cancer Project, a program of the Physicians' Committee for Responsible Medicine.

Biography
Beverly Lynn Bennett was born in Ohio in 1967. She became a vegetarian in 1987, and earned a culinary arts degree from the University of Akron in 1988. After receiving her degree, she worked at various vegetarian and vegan restaurants, and at natural food stores.

Bennett is in a relationship with her frequent co-author, Ray Sammartano, who is also vegan., whom she lives with in Eugene, Oregon.

Bibliography

Cookbooks
The Complete Idiot's Guide to Vegan Living (Alpha Books, 2005)
The Complete Idiot's Guide to Vegan Cooking (Alpha Books, 2008)
Vegan Bites: Recipes for Singles (Book Publishing Company, 2008)The Complete Idiot's Guide to Gluten-Free Vegan Cooking (Alpha Books, 2011)The Complete Idiot's Guide to Vegan Slow Cooking (Alpha Books, 2012)The Complete Idiot's Guide to Vegan Living, Second Edition (Alpha Books, 2012)

E-cookbooksEat Your Veggies! Recipes from the Kitchen of the Vegan Chef''

Sources

1967 births
American chefs
American food writers
American veganism activists
Chefs of vegan cuisine
Gluten-free cookbook writers
Living people
Vegan cookbook writers
Writers from Eugene, Oregon